Eric Kuhn is an American media executive, Broadway producer, and entrepreneur. Kuhn is the senior vice president of social media marketing for CBS. Earlier in his career, he launched social media platforms for CNN, CBS News and the NBA, and served as the first head of social media for United Talent Agency. Kuhn was a co-founder and the chief marketing officer for Layer3 TV, a Denver-based cable television company that was acquired by T-Mobile in 2018.  In February 2020, it was reported that Kuhn had joined the Bloomberg 2020 campaign as senior adviser on social media and influencers.

Early life and education 
Kuhn was born in New York City and grew up in Hastings-on-Hudson, New York.  At 17, he hosted a television show on WHHS, a public access television station in Westchester County.  He booked and interviewed politicians. He attended Hamilton College and graduated from Hamilton with a BA in government.
While at Hamilton, Kuhn hosted radio show that aired on WHCL focusing on media and politics.

Career
While in college, Kuhn was hired by CBS News as a new media consultant. He  ran the Twitter account, @CBSNews, and oversaw the viral marketing team to promote the CBS Evening News with Katie Couric online. He was "the digital architect" of Katie Couric's viral interview with Sarah Palin. Kuhn also created the social media strategy for the NBA and launched the NBA's Twitter account.

Following his graduation from Hamilton, Kuhn was hired as the first audience interaction producer for CNN, where he managed CNN's Twitter account, @CNN, and oversaw Twitter accounts for anchors, correspondents, and producers. He also reported on technology, government and politics for CNN.com.

In 2010, Kuhn was hired  by United Talent Agency, who created a position for him as the agency's head of social media.  He represented  technology companies as well as UTA clients, advising on digital practices including branding,  marketing, and online endorsements.

In 2014, Kuhn joined Denver-based Layer3 TV, a cable company that integrated social media and OTT programming, as co-founder and chief marketing officer. The company was sold to T-Mobile in January 2018.

In 2018, Kuhn served as a producer for two Broadway theater productions: Harvey Fierstein's Torch Song,  and the revival of Oklahoma!  In 2019, he won a Tony as a producer of Oklahoma and was nominated for a Tony as a producer of Torch Song.

In February 2020, Kuhn joined the Bloomberg 2020 campaign as senior adviser on social media and influencers. He was named senior vice president of social media marketing at CBS in June 2020.He won his second Tony in 2021 as a producer of The Inheritance.

Boards and affiliations
Kuhn is a member of the Lincoln Center Theater Board of Directors, a founding board member of NPR's Generation Listen, and an Earthjustice council member. He is on the digital advisory board for the USO, and the board of directors for SeriesFest.

Personal life
Kuhn hosts "Bytes and Bylines," an annual technology and media event produced in conjunction with the White House Correspondents Dinner.
 Additionally, he manages chess Grandmaster Fabiano Caruana.

Recognition 
Tony Award, 2019 (Oklahoma!, Best Revival of a Musical, producer)
The Wired 100 (2016)
The Hollywood Reporter Next Generation Execs 2016: Hollywood Up and Comers Under 35
Cablefax Overachievers Under 30 (2015 and 2016) 
Los Angeles Global Shapers (World Economic Forum)
 Vanity Fair “Next Establishment” (2011)
Forbes “30 under 30” in Entertainment (2012)

References

Hamilton College (New York) alumni
American business executives
1987 births
Living people